The G-Cloud (or G-Cloud complex) is an interstellar cloud located next to the Local Interstellar Cloud, within the Local Bubble. It is unknown whether the Solar System is embedded in the Local Interstellar Cloud or in the region where the two clouds are interacting, although the Solar System is currently moving towards the G-Cloud. The G-Cloud contains the stars Alpha Centauri (a triple star system that includes Proxima Centauri) and Altair (and possibly others).

Estimates for the n(H I) particle density in the direction of Alpha Centauri. were made in 2011 by Crawford as 0.1 cm−3  and in 2014 by Gry as 0.098 cm−3.

References